Cyclonic Storm Maarutha was the first tropical cyclone to make landfall in Myanmar in April. The first tropical cyclone and named storm of the 2017 North Indian Ocean cyclone season, Maarutha was a relatively short-lived and weak system, nonetheless causing notable damage in Myanmar. Maarutha formed from an area of low pressure over the southern Bay of Bengal on April 15. The next morning, RSMC New Delhi upgraded the low-pressure area to a Depression and designated it as BOB 01.

Meteorological History
 
On April 11, an upper air circulation developed over the Andaman Sea, where it moved north-eastwards and concentrated into a low pressure trough over the next day. JTWC reported that the disturbance was located within a favourable environment for further development and that convection had started to wrap into the elongated low level circulation centre. The system continued to develop and was classified as Depression BOB 01, by the India Meteorological Department (IMD) early on April 15.

Preparations

Myanmar
The Union Minister for Social Welfare, Relief and Resettlement, the Vice President, ministers and disaster response team of Myanmar had an emergency meeting on the morning of April 16 to prepare rescue teams and arrange food and water stockpiles in disaster zones.

Andaman and Nicobar Islands
Shortly after the development was reported, the cyclone struck, causing severe waves and hence harm for people on the water.

Impact and aftermath

Myanmar

A total of 81 houses, worth about Ks3.7 million were damaged by the storm. Three houses were destroyed by fallen trees. Six lamp posts collapsed. Some houses had superficial damage as coconut palms collapsed on them. The Myanmar Meteorological Agency reported that accumulated rainfall for the 24 hours before April 17 at 9:30 a.m. local time totaled  for Bago. The town of Pyay received . In the Rahkine Region, the city of Kyauckpyu received  of rainfall in a 24-hour period. In the Mon State, Thaton, a town in southern Myanmar received  of rainfall. Four people were reported killed in the Irrawady division of Myanmar.

India
Cyclone Maarutha, as a deep depression, left hundreds of tourists stranded in Havelock Island of Andaman and Nicobar Islands from heavy rainfall.

In Andhra Pradesh and Odisha, heatwave conditions worsened as the cyclone drew all the moisture towards itself resulting in severe hot and dry weather.

Records
Myanmar shares the Bay of Bengal coast with neighbouring countries Bangladesh and India. It has experienced strong tropical cyclones from May to November. Notable destructive cyclones that affected Myanmar include Cyclone Nargis in 2008, Cyclone Giri in 2010 and Cyclone Mala in 2006. According to the IMD, Maarutha was the first ever cyclone to maintain peak intensity until landfall on Myanmar in the month of April. Cyclone Bijli in April 2009 weakened into a depression prior to landfall in Bangladesh.

See also

Weather of 2017
Tropical cyclones in 2017
 Cyclone Bijli – a storm of similar intensity in 2009 that made landfall in Bangladesh 
 Cyclone Mora – a strong tropical cyclone in 2017 which made landfall near Maarutha's landfall.
 Tropical cyclones in Myanmar – for other storms of similar nature.

References

External links

 01B.MAARUTHA  from the U.S. Naval Research Laboratory

2017 North Indian Ocean cyclone season
Tropical cyclones in Myanmar
Cyclonic storms
April 2017 events in Asia
2017 in Myanmar
Tropical cyclones in 2017
2017 disasters in Myanmar